Friedrich Müller (7 February 1907 – 15 May 1978) was a German international footballer.

References

1907 births
1978 deaths
Association football forwards
German footballers
Germany international footballers